The Nassau Club of Princeton, New Jersey, founded in 1889 by, among others, Woodrow Wilson as a town-and-gown club to bring the townspeople and the University faculty together, is now a private social club.  It moved into its current location in 1903.  The clubhouse was originally built in 1813-14 as the home of Samuel Miller, the second professor of the Princeton Theological Seminary, on land belonging to his father-in-law, Continental Congressman Jonathan Dickinson Sergeant.  Sergeant had built a large house on the site shortly before the American Revolution but it was burned down during the British occupation prior to the Battle of Princeton.

The club provides dining and social spaces, as well as guest rooms for visiting members.  Originally formed as a men's club, it has allowed both male and female members for several decades.  The clubhouse was expanded in 1911, by architect Aymar Embury II, and in 1969 a banquet dining room was added, with extensive renovations in 1992.

In popular culture, the Nassau Club was referenced in the lyrics of the 1981 hit song The American by Scottish rock group Simple Minds.

Notable Members
Grover Cleveland
Woodrow Wilson

References

External links
Official website

Buildings and structures in Princeton, New Jersey
Clubs and societies in the United States